Newcomen may refer to:

People
John Newcomen (c.1613–1630), English first white settler murdered by another white settler in Plymouth Colony, Massachusetts
Matthew Newcomen (c. 1610–1669), English nonconformist churchman
Thomas Newcomen (1663–1729), English ironmonger and inventor

Other uses
Viscount Newcomen, of Mosstown in the County of Longford, a title in the Peerage of Ireland
Newcomen baronets, of Kenagh in the County of Longford, a title in the Baronetage of Ireland
Newcomen Society, a British learned society
Newcomen Society of the United States, an educational foundation
Newcomen atmospheric engine, a device to harness the power of steam to produce mechanical work

English-language surnames